Harklowa  is a village in the administrative district of Gmina Skołyszyn, within Jasło County, Subcarpathian Voivodeship, in south-eastern Poland.

The village has a population of 2,000. Polish supercentenarian Aleksandra Dranka (1903-2014) was born in and lived there.

References

Villages in Jasło County